"Breakdown" is a song performed by American hip hop group Fu-Schnickens. It is the opening track on their second studio album Nervous Breakdown and was issued as the album's second single. The song samples "Dance Floor" by Zapp and "Theme from the Black Hole" by Parliament. It was the group's last song to chart on the Billboard Hot 100, peaking at No. 67 in 1994.

Music video

The official music video for the song was directed by Marcus Nispel.

Chart positions

References

External links 
 
 

1994 songs
1994 singles
Fu-Schnickens songs
Jive Records singles
Music videos directed by Marcus Nispel
Songs written by Roger Troutman
Songs written by Larry Troutman